Ace of Diamond is an anime series based on the manga by Yuji Terajima serialized in Weekly Shōnen Magazine. 

The TV series was produced by Madhouse and Production I.G and began airing on October 6, 2013, on TX Network stations and later on AT-X. The episodes were simulcast in the US, Canada, UK, Ireland, Australia, New Zealand, South Africa, Denmark, Finland, Iceland, the Netherlands, Norway, Sweden, Central and South America, Spain, Brazil, and Portugal by Crunchyroll with English and German subtitles. The series was initially planned to be 52 episodes but was extended and ended in March 2015. 

A second season started airing soon after on April 6, 2015 on TX Network stations and later on AT-X. Like its predecessor the episodes were simulcast in the aforementioned countries by Crunchyroll with English and German subtitles. 

An anime adaptation of Ace of Diamond Act II has been announced, and it premiered on April 2, 2019. The cast and staff will reprise their roles from the previous series, with Madhouse returning for animation production. The series is listed for 52 episodes.

Series overview

Episode list

Season 1 (2013–2015)

Season 2 (2015–2016)

Ace of Diamond Act II (2019–20)

OVA

References

Ace of Diamond